This is a list of Saint Petersburg Metro stations.

The number sign # denotes the station provides cross-platform interchange design.
"A" of the depth column denotes above ground station.

Expansion dynamics

External links
 Saint Petersburg Metro official site

Saint Petersburg
 Stations
 
Saint Petersburg
Metro stations